Stuer may refer to:

People
 Eric Stuer (1953–2008), American percussionist
 Erling Stuer Lauridsen (1916–2012), Danish wrestler
 Lisbet Stuer-Lauridsen (born 1968), Danish badminton player
 Lowie Stuer (born 1995), Belgian volleyball player
 Philipp Stüer (born 1976), German rower
 Thomas Stuer-Lauridsen (born 1971), Danish badminton player

Places
 Stuer, Mecklenburg-Vorpommern, Germany